Paagal is a 2021 Indian Telugu-language romantic comedy film written and directed by debutante Naresh Kuppili and produced by Bekkem Venugopal under the banner of Lucky Media. The film stars Vishwak Sen, Nivetha Pethuraj, Bhumika Chawla and Murali Sharma. The release was postponed multiple times due to the COVID-19 pandemic in India. The film was released on 14 August 2021.

Plot 

Prem, an 8-year-old boy is taken care of by his mother (Bhumika Chawla). He loves his mother very much and so does his mother. They live happily but one day, his mother dies of cancer without proper medication. Prem is very depressed because of his mother's sudden demise. His friend suggests he love a girl sincerely and in turn, he will get the same love and affection which his mother used to show. He writes a letter to his deceased mother, ties it to a helium balloon, and releases it.

From there on, Prem starts proposing to every girl but gets rejected. One day, he sees an elder girl who is dumped by her boyfriend and proposes to her. She rejects him as he is younger than her and is still studying without having a job and money. Realizing this, he studies very hard and after seven years, he gets hired in a big company with a high salary. He goes to the girl to propose, but when he reaches her home, it turns out that she is married and has a child. This saddens him and once again his friend suggests he go to Vishakapatnam as girls there are known to accept love easily.

Now in Vishakapatnam, Prem continues his search for a suitable girl. There, he encounters a gang teasing a girl, Radha. Prem saves her from the gang and immediately proposes to her. This time, the girl likes him but does not reveal it. After spending a few days with him, she takes the initiative to propose in a cafe. While she is proposing, Prem watches Mogali Rekulu, a popular TV serial that he watched with his mother. Angry about this, Radha rejects him.

This time, his friend suggests finding a wealthy girl. As he is searching for such a girl, he comes across Sofie and tries to impress her. But Prem later learns that she already has a boyfriend and that she had just used Prem for money.

This time his friend suggests finding an “unattractive” girl. He finds Mahalakshmi, who is dark and chubby, and proposes to her. Mahalakshmi accepts it but also uses this as an opportunity to show all the people who had teased her that she will not get any boyfriend due to her appearance. After a few days, she breaks up with Prem, telling him that a marriage alliance has been fixed for her at home.

With all of this happening, Prem is shattered. While he is sitting depressed, he sees MLA contestant Raja Reddy and proposes to him. Raja Reddy gets creeped out and tries to ignore Prem, but Prem keeps troubling him to love. Frustrated, he plans to kill Prem. When Raja Reddy's goons are about to kill Prem the opposition party's leader also sends a few thugs over to kill Raja Reddy, but Prem saves him from the thugs even though he was badly injured by Raja Reddy's goons. Being touched by this, Raja Reddy starts developing feelings for Prem. After a few days, Prem is shown standing on top of a tall building trying to commit suicide and called Raja Reddy to propose (read: say I love you) to him at the building. By then, Raja Reddy comes there and proposes to Prem to save him, but Prem shoots Raja Reddy instead. Shocked and sad, Raja Reddy asks Prem why he wants to kill him.

The story then flashes back to Vishakapatnam when Prem decides to commit suicide as he was not successful in finding a girl who loves him like his mother. When he is about to fall from the flyover, a girl screams "I love you" at him. He then goes searching for the girl and finds out that she is Theera. He asks her why she proposed to him. She tells him that she said "I love you" to save him.  Prem tells her that he loves her now, but she does not accept his proposal. To show his true love, he jumps from a running train, injuring himself. Then Theera reveals that she is already engaged and by loving him, she does not want to break her promise to her father. Her father had adopted Theera from an orphanage and took care of her like his own daughter. But Prem declares that he will love her till her marriage day and then will disappear from her sight.

They both start spending days together. They also act close in front of Prem's friends and his ex-girlfriends Radha, Sofie and Mahalakshmi to make them jealous and teach them a lesson. During these days, Theera's friends find out that Theera is starting to have feelings for Prem and warn her to stay away from him as there are just six days left for her marriage. From there on, Theera starts avoiding Prem, but Prem goes mad without meeting and talking with Theera. While searching for her, he meets with a minor accident in front of Theera. Finally seeing Theera, he asks her where had she gone to. Theera then reveals to him that there are only three days left for her marriage. Prem is shattered at this news. Not wanting to hurt him, she tells him that in these three days, she wants to make the most memorable moments of her life and goes to her pg.

The next day, she waits for Prem but he does not show up. Theera searches for Prem the whole day but with no avail as to where he went. Early morning the consequent day, Prem's friend informs her about Prem's location. She immediately goes there and finds Prem. She acts strangely and Prem tells her that she has feelings for him. Then, Theera reveals to him that she does love him and that when they were young, she received one of the helium balloons and had followed him wherever he was going. But she tells him she cannot love and marry him without her father's acceptance.

She goes to her house for the marriage but is not able to forget Prem. Simultaneously, it is shown that her father is none other than Raja Reddy. Prem comes to her house, but Theera tells him that she cannot cheat her father. Meanwhile, Raja Reddy's goons see them together and misunderstand that she is eloping with him. Raja Reddy goon informs this news to Raja Reddy, who decides to get his daughter killed. Theera then meets with a car accident which was planned by Raja Reddy and seems to have died from the injuries.

The movie then comes back to the present, and Prem is shown to teach Raja Reddy a lesson, and Raja Reddy realizes his mistakes and regrets for his daughter's death. But Prem tells him that Theera is still alive but that she does not know that her father had plotted to kill her.

In the ending credits, it is shown that Prem brings Raja Reddy to where Theera is staying. Both daughter and father exchange their happiness. Prem and Theera get married with a happy ending.

Cast 
 Vishwak Sen as Prem
 Nivetha Pethuraj as Theera
 Murali Sharma as MLA Raja Reddy "Raji"
 Simran Choudhary as Sofie
 Megha Lekha as Radha
 Rahul Ramakrishna as Youth leader
 Mahesh Achanta as Mahesh
 Indraja Shankar as Baby
Auto Ram Prasad
 Bhumika Chawla in a cameo appearance as Prem's mother

Production

Development and casting 
Producer Bekkem Venugopal on 19 March 2020 announced the launch of their project titled Paagal with Vishwak Sen in the lead role and directed by debutant Naresh Kuppili. The film's crew members also included music director Radhan, cinematographer Manikandan and editor Garry BH. A pooja ceremony coinciding with a formal launch event was held on the same day, however production was delayed due to the COVID-19 pandemic lockdown in India. On her scenes in the film, Nivetha Pethuraj told that "Firstly I was not asked for on screen kiss for the film by the director. The script is so beautiful just the way it is."

Filming 
Principal photography commenced on 21 September 2020, post government permitted to resume film shootings adhering to the COVID-19 protocol. Initially he did not want to resume shooting for the film along with the sequel for HIT: The First Case, with limited crew members as the scripts of both films demand a larger team. However, with a change of mind, he decided to go on with the shooting procedure with all necessary safety precautions. Vishwak joined the film's shooting sets in November 2020. With major portions being filmed in Hyderabad, the team headed to Pondicherry for a special song shoot at the end of November. Shooting for the film was wrapped up in December 2020. Sen completed his portions of dubbing in May 2021.

Soundtrack 

The film's soundtrack is composed by Radhan and released by Aditya Music label. The first single from the film – the titular track was released on 10 March 2021. The song had lyrics written by Chandrabose and sung by Ram Miriyala. The second single "Saradaga Kasepaina" sung by Karthik and Purnima, with lyrics written by Ananta Sriram was released on 31 March 2021. The third single "Ee Single Chinnode" sung by Benny Dayal , with lyrics written by Krishna Kanth, was released on 2 June 2021. Full video version of the first track "Paagal" was released on 8 August 2021. The fourth single "Aagave Nuvvagave" was sung by Sid Sriram with the lyrics written by Krishna Kanthh was released on 11 August 2021. Another track "Kanapadava" was composed by Leon James and was sung by Anand Aravindakshan with the lyrics written by Prasanna Kumar Bezawada was released on 13 August 2021. Soundtrack album was released on 14 August 2021.

A critic of Asianet News Telugu felt that soundtrack and film score are the highlights of the film. Another critic too opined the same and felt that film score composed by James, elevates the scenes.

Release 
Dil Raju announced co-producing and presenting the film under the banner Sri Venkateswara Creations in February 2021. At the film's first look poster which released on 2 February 2021, the team announced a release date of 30 April 2021. However, on 18 March 2021, a new release date of 1 May 2021 was announced. The film was again postponed due to the second wave of the COVID-19 pandemic.

Marketing 
As a part of a promotional strategy, the filmmakers announced that the trailer of the film will be screened only in theatres and will not be released online, despite the film's teaser which released online on 18 February 2021. Furthermore, the team planned for a 15-day promotional tour across Andhra Pradesh and Telangana as a part of the marketing purposes.

Home media 
The film's digital rights were sold to Amazon Prime Video and it was premiered on 3 September 2021.

Reception 
Paagal generally received negative reviews criticising film's storyline, screenplay and dragged narration, but praised Vishwak Sen's performance and soundtrack of the film. Neeshita Nyayapati of The Times of India gave a rating of 2.5 out of 5, and stated that "Paagal is an over-drawn yet quirky love story with a flimsy storyline guiding you through it. And does have its redeemable qualities though." Sangeetha Devi Dundoo of The Hindu called it "bizarre romcom drama" and felt that "The story idea of a man seeking mother’s love from his life partner is contrived; it’s time the on-screen lover boys get real and grow up."

A reviewer from The Hans India rated the film 2.5 out of 5, and praised performances of the cast, Sen in particlular. They, however, criticized the slow-placed narration and screenplay, writing "Overall, 'Paagal' is an average film with the same old storyline blended with some decent comedy scenes. A critic of Pinkvilla praised acting performances of Vishwak Sen and Murali Sharma and added that "The biggest flaw in 'Paagal' is that it has a very unevolved idea of love at its core." Sakshi's Anji Shetty opined that acting performances of lead actors, music and cinematography are its positives, while film's screenplay is its negative. Eenadu criticized the film's screenplay and praised Vishwak's performance, film score and cinematography.

In its review, NTV stated – "‘Paagal’ has got a strong premise. But the narration is too misguided to save the story from seeming frivolous." Deccan Chronicle called it "a half-baked romcom", adding that the film is "cheesy, unnatural, half-baked bag of borrowings".

References

External links 
 

Indian romantic comedy films
2021 films
2020s Telugu-language films
2021 romantic comedy films
Films shot in Hyderabad, India
Films set in Hyderabad, India
Films shot in Visakhapatnam
Films set in Visakhapatnam
2021 directorial debut films
Sri Venkateswara Creations films